The Ramaytush language is one of the eight Ohlone languages, historically spoken by the Ramaytush people who were indigenous to California. Historically, the Ramaytush inhabited the San Francisco Peninsula between San Francisco Bay and the Pacific Ocean in the area which is now San Francisco and San Mateo Counties. Ramaytush is a dialect or language within the Ohlone branch of the Utian family. The term Ramaytush was first applied to it during the 1970s.

The Ramaytush language territory was largely bordered by ocean, except in the south, which was bordered by the people of the Santa Clara Valley who spoke the Tamyen language and the people of the Santa Cruz Mountains and Pacific Coast at Point Año Nuevo who spoke dialects merging toward the Awaswas language. To the east, across San Francisco Bay, were tribes that spoke the Chochenyo language. To the north, across the Golden Gate, was the Huimen local tribe of Coast Miwok language speakers. The northernmost Ramaytush local tribe, the Yelamu of San Francisco, were intermarried with the Huchiun Chochenyos of the Oakland area at the time of Spanish colonization.

European disease took a heavy toll of life on all tribal people who came to Mission Dolores after its creation in 1776. The Ohlone people were forced to use Spanish, resulting in the loss of their language. Hundreds of Ohlone people at Mission Dolores were taken to the north bay to construct Mission San Rafael, which was then used as a hospital for sick neophytes. Alfred L. Kroeber claimed that the west bay people were extinct by 1915.

See also
 Sánchez Adobe Park
 San Pedro y San Pablo Asistencia
 Utian languages

Notes

References 
 Heizer, Robert F. 1974. The Costanoan Indians. De Anza College History Center: Cupertino, California.
 Milliken, Randall. A Time of Little Choice: The Disintegration of Tribal Culture in the San Francisco Bay Area 1769–1910 Menlo Park, CA: Ballena Press Publication, 1995. .

Ohlone languages
Extinct languages of North America
Culture in the San Francisco Bay Area
History of the San Francisco Bay Area

hr:Ramaytush